Pakistani Bengal may refer to:
East Bengal, a province of the Dominion of Pakistan
East Pakistan, eastern provincial wing of Pakistan between 1955 and 1971